Lauraine Snelling is an author of Christian fiction and has published more than 80 titles since 1982, among them popular historical fiction series revolving around Norwegian immigration and inspired by her own heritage. In 2012, Snelling was inducted into the Scandinavian-American Hall of Fame, a signature event at Norsk Høstfest. Her books have sold more than 5 million copies. Besides writing books and articles, she teaches at writers' conferences across the country. She and her husband make their home in Tehachapi, California.

List of works by Lauraine Snelling

Red River of the North series 
First of the popular Red River/Blessing series.
Published by Bethany House.  Re-released with new covers in 2007.

 An Untamed Land, 1996
 A New Day Rising, 1996
 A Land To Call Home, 1997
 The Reaper’s Song, 1998
 Tender Mercies, 1999
 Blessing In Disguise, 1999

Return To Red River series 
Second of the popular Red River/Blessing series. Published by Bethany House: "Returning a generation later to the Red River valley and the Bjorklund farm, this series follows the family as the now adult children look to their own future."

 A Dream To Follow, 2001
 Believing The Dream, 2002
 More Than A Dream, 2003

Daughters of Blessing series 
Third in the popular Red River/Blessing series.
Published by Bethany House: "returns to North Dakota in 1900 and to favorite characters from the Red River of the North series."

 A Promise for Ellie, 2006
 Sophie's Dilemma, 2007
 A Touch of Grace, 2008
 Rebecca's Reward, 2008

Home to Blessing series 
Fourth in the popular Red River/Blessing series. 
Published by Bethany House.

 A Measure of Mercy, October 1, 2009
 No Distance Too Far, April 1, 2010
 A Heart for Home, March 1, 2011

Song of Blessing Series
Fifth in the popular Red River/Blessing Series.
Published by Bethany House.

 To Everything a Season (October 2014)
 A Harvest of Hope (March 2015)
 Streams of Mercy (October 2015)
 From this Day Forward (October 2016)

A Blessing Prequel
Set before the events in the Red River of the North Series.
Published by Bethany House.

 An Untamed Heart (October 2013)

Dakotah Treasures series 
Published by Bethany House: "tells the stories of four women surviving and flourishing in the Dakotah territories".

 Ruby, 2003
 Pearl, 2004
 Opal, 2005
 Amethyst, 2005

Secret Refuge series 
Published by Bethany House: "When the Civil War comes to Kentucky, Jesselynn Highwood is forced to make a fateful decision to save the Thoroughbreds that she promised her dying father she’d protect."

 Daughter of Twin Oaks, 2000
 Sisters of the Confederacy, 2000
 The Long Way Home, 2001

Wild West Wind Series
 Valley of Dreams
 Whispers in the Wind (July 2012)
 A Place to Belong (March 2013)

Under Northern Skies
 A Promise of Dawn (August 2017)
 A Breath of Hope (April 2018)
 A Season of Grace (November 2018)
 A Song of Joy (coming August 2019)

Dakota Plains series 
Published by Heartsong.

 Dakota Dawn - Heartsong 28, 1997
 Dakota Dream - Heartsong 44, 1993
 Dakota Dusk - Heartsong 66, 1995
 Dakota December - Heartsong 128

Standalone books 
 Tragedy on the Toutle also released as What about Cimarron, published by Baker Books, 1982
 Song of Laughter - Heartsong 10, 1986
 Race for Roses - Heartsong 350, 1999
 Hawaiian Sunrise, published by Bethany House, 1999
 The Gift, published by Promise Press, 2002
 The Healing Quilt, published by WaterBrook Press, 2002
 The Way of Women, published by WaterBrook Press, 2004
 Saturday Morning, published by WaterBrook Press, 2005
 Washington (Novella with Wanda E. Brunstetter), Published by Barbour Publishing, 2005 - includes Song of Laughter and Race for Roses
 Once Upon A Christmas (Novella with Lenora Worth), Published by Steeple Hill, 2005
 The Brushstroke Legacy, published by WaterBrook Press, 2006
 Breaking Free, published by FaithWords, 2007
 One Perfect Day, 2008
 A Hand to Hold: Helping Someone Through Grief (Non-fiction), published by Revell, 2004
 Reunion, published by FaithWords, 2012
 Wake the Dawn, published by FaithWords, 2013
 Heaven Sent Rain, published by FaithWords, 2014
 Someday Home, published by Faithwords, 2015
 Second Half, published by FaithWords, 2016
 Half Finished, published by FaithWords, 2019

Youth fiction

Golden Filly series 
 Golden Filly Collection 1
 Golden Filly Collection 2

High Hurdles series 
 High Hurdles Collection 1
 High Hurdles Collection 2

S.A.V.E. Squad series 
 Dog Daze
 The Great Cat Caper
 Secondhand Horses
 No Ordinary Owl

References

External links
LauraineSnelling.com Official Web Site
Christianbook.com

Living people
Christian writers
20th-century American novelists
21st-century American novelists
American women novelists
American historical novelists
20th-century American women writers
21st-century American women writers
Women historical novelists
Year of birth missing (living people)